Lindi can mean:
Lindi Region in Tanzania
Lindi, the capital of Lindi Region
The Lindi River in the Democratic Republic of the Congo
Lindi, Estonia
Lingti, a town in Tibet, also spelled Lindi
Lindi St Clair, prostitute and author
Albert Lindegger, artist and satirist, also known as Lindi